Rengifo is a surname. Notable people with the surname include:

Alma Beatriz Rengifo (1953–2015), Colombian lawyer and politician
César Rengifo (1915–1980), Venezuelan painter, writer, poet and journalist
Erik Rengifo (born 1989), American soccer player
Federico Rengifo, 25th Ambassador of Colombia to France
Hernán Rengifo (born 1983), Peruvian footballer
Luis Rengifo (born 1997), Venezuelan baseball player
Manuel Rengifo (1793–1845), Chilean politician
Raúl Gonzalo Cuero Rengifo, African Colombian professor of microbiology
Tomás Rengifo, Salvadoran former swimmer
Ana Rengifo (born 1994), Colombian bookkeeper.

See also
FAP Captain David Abensur Rengifo International Airport (IATA: PCL, ICAO: SPCL), Pucallpa, Ucayali Region, Peru
Moisés Benzaquén Rengifo Airport (IATA: YMS, ICAO: SPMS), Yurimaguas, a town on the Huallaga River, Loreto Region, Peru
RENGO
Rengo